Laal Singh Chaddha is a 2022 Indian Hindi-language comedy drama film directed by Advait Chandan and written by Atul Kulkarni. Produced by Paramount Pictures, Aamir Khan Productions and Viacom18 Studios, it is an authorized adaptation of the 1994 American film Forrest Gump which itself is an adaptation of the novel of the same name by Winston Groom. The film stars Aamir Khan as the title character alongside Kareena Kapoor, Naga Chaitanya (in his Hindi film debut) and Mona Singh.

The adaptation of Forrest Gump underwent a series of changes over a period of two decades, with Kulkarni spending the first ten years adapting the script, and another ten years purchasing the remake rights. Aamir Khan bought the rights of the film in early 2018 with the help of Los Angeles-based  producer and director Radhika Chaudhari and announced the film officially on 14 March 2019, with its title. The film's score is by Tanuj Tiku, while its original songs are composed by Pritam and their lyrics are written by Amitabh Bhattacharya.

Laal Singh Chaddha has been filmed in more than 100 Indian locations. Principal photography began in October 2019 and concluded in September 2021, after multiple delays due to the COVID-19 pandemic. The film was initially scheduled for cinema release during multiple dates in 2020–2022, but kept getting delayed due to the production halt caused by the pandemic, and was theatrically released worldwide on 11 August 2022, coinciding with Raksha Bandhan and Independence Day. It opened to mixed-to-positive reviews from critics and audience, with praise for its adaptation to the new setting, faithfulness to the source material, depth, soundtrack, background score and emotion, but received criticism for Khan's performance. Against its ₹180 crore budget, the film generated a worldwide revenue of less than ₹90 crore in its first week and was thus declared a box office bomb, although it became the highest-grossing Hindi film of 2022 at international box office, earning more than Gangubai Kathiawadi and The Kashmir Files.

Plot
In 2014, on a train bound for Karauli, a man named Laal Singh Chaddha recounts the story of his life to strangers who happen to sit next to him, while eating golgappas. As a boy in 1977, Laal has an IQ of 75 and is fitted with leg braces to correct a curved spine. He lives in Karoli, Punjab, with his mother, who runs a farm and encourages him to live beyond his disabilities. He meets a girl named Rupa D'Souza on his first day at school, and the two become best friends. One day, a group of bullies starts pelting stones at Laal. When he runs to escape them, his leg braces come off, and he realizes that he is a fast runner. Rupa's father is arrested by the police as he beat her mother to death. When Rupa's mother dies, she is sent to live with her grandmother, who used to work at Laal’s house. Laal was happy because now he and Rupa could always be together. When the 1984 anti-Sikh riots break out, Laal and his mother go to stay at his aunt's place to be safe. There, Laal meets a young Shah Rukh Khan and teaches him dance steps and poses which he would later go on to use in his films.   

To save Laal from rioters, Laal's mother cuts off his long hair and removes his turban, to hide his identity as a Sikh. Laal’s mother sends him and Rupa to Hindu College in Delhi. There, Laal witnesses L.K. Advani's Ram Rath Yatra. Laal takes part in track and field, and wins many prizes, whereas Rupa starts taking part in modeling competitions, as she dreams of becoming a model in Mumbai and becoming rich. Sometime later, Laal joins the army, where he meets Balaraju Bodi aka Bala, who wants to start an undergarment business. They both decide to start an undergarment-manufacturing company together, once they leave the army. Rupa goes to Mumbai to pursue her dreams. 

In 1999, the Kargil War breaks out between India and Pakistan. Laal and Bala were in the same battalion. Rupa had told Laal to start running as soon as his life was in danger. When the Pakistani soldiers had an advantage, he runs, but realizes that Bala is left behind. He goes back, but every time he goes back, he finds another soldier who is injured and asks for help. He also saves a Pakistani commander, not knowing he was the enemy. He could not save Bala, leaving him heartbroken, but is awarded a medal by the Indian Government for saving five soldiers.

Rupa never responded to any letters that Laal sent her. She had become the mistress of a gangster who took advantage of her and lied to her about fulfilling her dreams (parallels are made to the controversial relationship of the infamous gangster Abu Salem and Monica Bedi). Laal goes to meet her and sees the gangster slap her; Laal responds angrily by beating him up. Laal says that he loves Rupa, but she tells him that they have no future together and that he should forget her. Laal suddenly sees Mohammed Paaji, the Pakistani commander he had saved during the war. He had escaped from the hospital before anyone could know his true identity and has been living alone, and using a wheelchair, ever since. The two strike a friendship and Mohammed loves him for his purity and innocence, also feeling guilty of his violent acts of terrorism. 

Laal finally starts the undergarment business, but doesn't know how to market his product. Then, Mohammed Paaji joins the team. Mohammed gives the idea that if the brand is named after a girl, then maybe their sales would increase. Laal knew only one girl, so he renames his company Rupa (a reference to the knitwear company of the same name). The sales start to grow, and soon the company was selling innerwear to all of India, making Laal and Mohammed successful entrepreneurs. Mohammed invests money in Bombay Stock Exchange what Laal thinks is "some kind of cowshed" and they become even richer. After a while, Mohammed returns to his country and opens a school for children. Laal gives half his earnings to Bala's family for having inspired the undergarment business venture. Laal's mother also passes away from cancer, leaving him alone. 

Laal dedicates his time to tending to the land his mother left him. Rupa comes back to stay with him. She reciprocates his feelings and the two make love. Sometime later, the police come and arrest Rupa, as she had links with the underworld, and take her away, without Laal knowing. She is sent to prison for six months. Laal is heartbroken and decides to go running "for no particular reason". He goes on a cross-country marathon for over four years. People think that he might be running for some great purpose, and the media start covering his journey. His run covers almost every inch of the country. After years of running, he suddenly stops. Many people had started running along with him, thinking that he was running for some great purpose. They ask him why he stopped, expecting a philosophical answer. Laal says that he is tired and that he just wants to go back home.  

On reaching home, Laal wears a turban again after many years. He is pleasantly surprised to know that Rupa had written him a lot of letters. He tells his fellow passengers on the train that Rupa had served her sentence and is now living in Chandigarh, and he is going to meet her. Laal reunites with Rupa and finds out that he is the father of her son named Aman. Laal is overwhelmed with emotion and the two get married. Rupa dies sometime later due to a disease. Laal takes care of Aman and takes him to the same school he went to, thinking his life had come full circle.

Cast 
 Aamir Khan as Laal Singh Chaddha 
Ahmad Ibn Umar as young Laal
 Kareena Kapoor as Rupa D'Souza, Laal's love interest and future wife
Hafsa Ashraf as young Rupa

 Kamran Singariya as Singh Sahab
 Naga Chaitanya as Balaraju "Bala" Bodi, Laal's colleague in the Indian Army and his good friend
 Mona Singh as Gurpreet Kaur Chaddha, Laal's mother
 Rohaan Singh as Aman Chaddha, Laal's son
 Manav Vij as Mohammed Bhai, a Pakistan Army Commander who befriends Laal and is known as Mohammed Paji
 Aaryaa Sharma as the woman passenger sitting in-front of Laal in the train
 Arun Bali as Old Sikh Man in train
 Jagat Rawat as Father of school
 Yuri Suri as Commanding Officer 
 Shah Rukh Khan as himself (cameo appearance)
Kamini Kaushal (cameo appearance) as the Old Sikh Woman sitting with the Old Sikh Man in the train
Gitikka Ganju Dhar as Manjeet Kaur, Laal's Aunt 
Harry Parmar as Abbas Haji, Rupa's boyfriend
 Guneet Singh Sodhi as Harry, Rupa's boyfriend 
 Syed Ashraf Karim as Chota Shakeel

Production

Development
In August 2018, Khan announced that he had purchased the remake rights of the 1994 American drama Forrest Gump, from Paramount Pictures, which produced the film, and also suggested he will play the lead role in this film. On 14 March 2019, coinciding with his 54th birthday, Khan officially announced the project which has been named Laal Singh Chaddha, with his ex-wife Kiran Rao co-producing the film. Advait Chandan, who previously directed Khan's Secret Superstar (2017), was signed in to direct the remake.

Kulkarni, who also worked with Khan in Rang De Basanti (2006), wrote the Hindi adaptation for the original. In an interview with Bollywood Hungama, Kulkarni said, "I wrote the script ten years ago, but Aamir took a couple of years because he did not believe that I must have written a good script. So he did not want to hurt me. After a few years, he heard the script and within 30 seconds he said I am going to do the film." Kulkarni also said that it took over seven years to get the remake rights from the makers of the original (Paramount), as the movie is solely based on the original. Once the studio confirmed with Radhika Chaudhari that the rights were available, Khan made a trip to Los Angeles in February 2018 and met with the studio heads along with Radhika Chaudhari and the process of acquisition started.

Casting
Mukesh Chhabra was assigned as the casting director of the film.
Aamir Khan playing the title character, Kareena Kapoor was confirmed to play the female lead role in June 2019, thus pairing up with Khan for the third time after 3 Idiots (2009) and Talaash: The Answer Lies Within (2012). Manushi Chhillar was first choice for leading lady but, already signed a contract with Yash Raj Films. In August 2019, Vijay Sethupathi was signed alongside Khan, however he later opted out due to other commitments. In September 2019, Yogi Babu was approached to play a pivotal role. In November 2019, Mona Singh who also starred in Khan's 3 Idiots, was also cast in the pivotal role. Aamir Khan lost 20 kilograms for the younger version of his role in the film. In May 2021, Naga Chaitanya was confirmed to be a part of the cast, making his Bollywood debut.

Filming
While the film's principal photography was expected to commence in October 2019, Khan and his team went on scouting location in April 2019, across Dharmasala for five days.

Laal Singh Chaddha is reportedly filmed in more than 100 Indian locations. The principal photography of the film was commenced on 31 October 2019, with a muhurat shot given by Khan's mother Zeenat Hussain. The first schedule took place at Chandigarh, on 1 November and was completed within 21 days. Stills featuring Khan and Kapoor from the sets were leaked onto the internet, with Khan's look featuring him with a thick beard and turban went viral. A romantic track featuring Aamir Khan and Kareena Kapoor was shot at Chandigarh on 28 November 2019.

The second schedule was kickstarted in Kolkata on 5 December 2019. Aamir Khan and his team flew to Kerala in the second week of December, where Khan's photos of shooting from Thekkumbhagam, Changanassery and Kappil went viral. Khan completed the second schedule on 19 December 2019, and kickstarted the third schedule on 21 December 2019, with shooting took place in Jaisalmer, Goa and Himachal Pradesh. The third schedule was completed on 12 February 2020, and Khan headed to Chandigarh for their next schedule. The team wrapped up the last leg of shoot on 6 March 2020. The cast and crew flew back to shoot in Punjab on 16 March 2020, before production of the film got halted owing to the COVID-19 pandemic in India.

Aamir Khan cancelled the Ladakh schedule on 6 July, owing to the India-China standoff along the Galwan Valley. Later due to difficulties in shooting the film across India, Aamir decided to resume the film's shoot in Turkey, for the recce of new shoot. On 7 September 2020, Aamir Khan resumed the shooting of the film in Mumbai, with safety measures and guidelines instructed by the government. On 27 September 2020, Aamir and his team flew to Delhi to shoot some portions, with pictures featuring his younger version went viral. Some scenes were shot at the Hotel Centaur in Delhi on 7 October 2020. Kareena Kapoor wrapped up her portions on 15 October 2020.

Khan suffered a rib injury while shooting an action sequence, but ensuring that there is no delay in the shoot, the actor took a few pain killers and tried to subside his injury for the time being and continued working as he knew that there were special arrangements made for the shooting schedule. Earlier, while shooting for an important running sequence, Aamir Khan had suffered extreme physical exertion due to constant running. The actor shot few sequences at a sports complex located at Noida on 28 October 2020.

In July 2021, Aamir Khan and his team flew to Ladakh, where they spent some one month and shot war sequences. After wrapping up the Ladakh schedule the team reached to Srinagar in the first week of August. In Srinagar, the shooting of the film was carried out at various places, some important sequences were shot at Delhi Public School Srinagar (DPS), Amar Singh College and Boulevard Road near Dal Lake. During shooting in the premises of DPS, a 12-year-old, visually impaired student Zainab Bilal aka RJ Zainab has interviewed Aamir Khan for the school's in-house radio station, Radio DPS. Chaitanya joined the production in July 2021 and completed shooting his portions by August 2021.

Aamir Khan, Kareena Kapoor Khan and Prakash Vaghasiya were seen resuming the shoot of the film in Mumbai on 13 September. After wrapping up portions together last year, the two of them reunited for patchwork shoot in Andheri. The film was wrapped up on 16 September 2021.

Marketing 
The trailer for the film was launched at the final of the 2022 Indian Premier League on 29 May.

Soundtracks 

The film score is composed by Tanuj Tiku while the original songs featured in the film are composed by Pritam, in his third collaboration with Aamir Khan after Dhoom 3 (2013) and Dangal (2016), and lyrics for the songs are written by Amitabh Bhattacharya.

The music sitting discussion was held at Khan's Panchgani House in August 2019, with composer Pritam and lyricist Bhattacharya, working on the film's music. The title track of Laal Singh Chaddha, which featured in the motion poster, was recorded by Mohan Kannan of the Agnee band in January 2020. The singer didn't initially know that he was singing for Aamir's film, who "loved" the song, a studio recording person told him. He mentioned in the article that lyricist Amitabh Bhattacharya has written a "gold" song and has beautifully "encapsulated the whole story". Sonu Nigam on his official YouTube page on 13 January 2022 mentioned that he just completed a recording of a "very beautiful" and "wonderfully written" song that took about 5 hours to record. The first song of the film Kahani was released on 28 April 2022. Sonu Nigam's song, Main Ki Karaan, was released on 12 May 2022. A song sung by Arijit Singh, Phir Na Aisi Raat Aayegi, released on 24 June 2022. The fourth song Tur Kalleyan took more than 6 weeks of shoot and was shot at multiple locations across India. The song was released on 15 July 2022. A second version of Kahani, sung by Sonu Nigam was released on 18 July 2022.  Tere Hawaale, a duet sung by Arijit Singh and Shilpa Rao, was released on 4 August 2022.

The songs Kahani and Tur Kalleyan had been re-recorded in both Tamil and Telugu languages prior to the release of the movie in both languages respectively. The Tamil lyrics have been penned by Muthamil and the Telugu lyrics by Bhaskarabhatla.

Music reception
Pinkvilla reviewing the track "Kahani" stated that "The 2-minute song takes you inside the world of Laal Singh Chaddha which is innocent, heartwarming, and all about creating beautiful memories." The Indian Express stated that "The mood and flavours of Laal Singh Chaddha are beautifully packed in its latest song "Kahani". Hindustan Times reviewing the track "Tur Kalleyan" stated that "The song captures the beauty of rising above everything else and walking alone."

Release

Theatrical
Laal Singh Chaddha released on 11 August 2022 alongside dubbed versions in Tamil and Telugu languages. Earlier, it was announced to release on 25 December 2020, coinciding with Christmas. However, due to production halt owing to COVID-19 pandemic in India, the release was delayed by a year to 24 December 2021, aiming for the Christmas weekend. It was later rescheduled to release on 11 February and then 14 April 2022, however, it was postponed. The Motion Picture Association gave the film a PG-13 rating for "some violent content, thematic elements and suggestive material."

Distribution
The film was distributed in India by Viacom18 Studios, while international distribution of the film was taken through Paramount Pictures. The Telugu rights for Andhra Pradesh and Telangana region of the film were acquired by Geetha Arts. The Tamil Nadu theatrical rights are acquired by Red Giant Movies.

Home media
The digital distribution rights were acquired initially by Netflix at a cost of 150 crore. However, after the catastrophic performance of the film, Netflix canceled the deal. Netflix had initially offered a figure of around 80–90 crore. Netflix finally offered a deal at  50 crore. The film was digitally streamed on Netflix from 6 October 2022 in Hindi and dubbed versions of Tamil and Telugu languages. Upon release, the film ranked in the top 10 in 13 countries in its first week on Netflix, the film finished second on the global non-English movies chart, with over 6.6 million hours viewed.

Reception

Critical response

India 
Laal Singh Chaddha received mixed to positive reviews from critics and audience. Devesh Sharma of Filmfare rated the film 4 out of 5 stars and wrote "Atul and Advait have invested more in the story than history. As a result, this has a better emotional core than the original". Sonil Dedhia of News 18 rated the film 4 out of 5 stars and wrote "Aamir Khan's Laal Singh Chaddha is a movie that deftly grapples with the pessimism of the world, but handled in a mature way". Renuka Vyavahare of The Times Of India rated the film 3.5 out of 5 stars and wrote "LSC holds onto the good old values that make it worthy of a family outing. You will particularly remember a crackling Shah Rukh Khan cameo". Stutee Ghosh of The Quint rated the film 3.5 out of 5 stars and wrote "Laal Singh Chaddha is made up of many memorable, heartwarming moments. It says a lot that will leave us smiling or moist eyed". Sukanya Verma of Rediff rated the film 3.5 out of 5 stars and wrote "Laal Singh Chaddha does not let its source down. And replacing a box of chocolates with a ready-to-eat gol gappe kit is geeeenius, like Laal's Ustad would say". Sanchita Jhunjhunwala of Zoom rated the film 3.5 out of 5 stars and wrote "The movie leaves you teary eyed, even though it doesn't make you cry, and that, we feel, makes it a job well done by the entire team!". Avinash Lohana of Pinkvilla rated the film 3 out of 5 stars and wrote "Aamir Khan and his team manage to live up to the original and present an entertaining watch". Nairita Mukherjee of India Today rated the film 3 out of 5 stars and wrote "For the most part, director Advait Chandan's Laal Singh Chaddha remains faithful to the original material".

Nandini Ramnath of Scroll.in rated the film 3 out of 5 stars and wrote "Except for a few crucial changes, the film is faithful to the beats of its source material". Rohit Bhatnagar of The Free Press Journal rated the film 3 out of 5 stars and wrote "The film is a bit too lengthy but Shah Rukh Khan’s cameo will make it up for you". Sushri Sahu of Mashable rated he film 3 out of 5 stars and wrote "Laal Singh Chaddha deserves a watch for its special cameo alone". Mugdha Kapoor of DNA India rated the film 3 out of 5 stars and wrote "Laal Singh Chaddha has made a valiant effort to deliver a message of forgiveness, optimism and compassion". Saibal Chatterjee of NDTV rated the film 3 out of 5 stars and wrote "A de-aged Aamir Khan throws all that he has into the role and comes up with a simpleton who is wondrously loveable". Anna M. M. Vetticad of Firstpost rated the film 2.5 out of 5 stars and wrote "Laal Singh Chaddha must stand on its own sans comparisons since it is being viewed in 2022 by a whole generation of viewers to whom Forrest Gump is not a cultural reference that evokes nostalgia". Shubhra Gupta of The Indian Express rated the film 2 out of 5 stars and wrote "It’s not just the pace of the film which is the trouble. It is also, centrally and crucially, Sardar Laal Singh Chaddha himself, as played by Aamir Khan". A critic for Bollywood Hungama rated the film 2 out of 5 stars and wrote "Despite fine performances and lovely moments the excessive length and slow pacing goes against Laal Singh Chaddha"

International 
Laal Singh Chaddha received mixed reviews from International critics and audience. Proma Khosla of Indie Wire rated the film 3.5 out of 5 stars and wrote "Kulkarni and Chandan deserve a whole box of gol gappe". Mike McCahill of The Guardian rated the film 3 out of 5 stars and wrote "Director Advait Chandan is too literal in his adaptation the film is dumb of the 90s classic but finds a warmth and political honesty the original lacks". Witney Seibold of Slash Film rated the film 7 out of 10 stars and wrote "Despite how corny it is, Laal Singh Chaddha it unexpectedly disarming". Carlos Aguilar of The Wrap stated "The setting and language have changed, but the story still thinks it's being uplifting about the neuroatypical even as it punches down". Siddhant Adlakha of Joy Sauce stated "Laal Singh Chaddha is an effective adaptation that not only localizes the specifics of Forrest Gump, but translates its relationship with its setting, swapping the self-professed peace and prosperity of '90s America for the more volatile and nationalistic climate of modern India, where the country's image of itself remains in constant flux". Nicolas Rapold of The New York Times commented that "The movie’s charms are limited by what comes to feel like a coddling conceit.".

Politics 
Hindu nationalists campaigned to boycott the film with twitter hashtags, prior to the release of the film. Articles abound on the net whereby it is said that Amir Khan continuously uses his films to insult Hindu gods and show Hindus in general in a negative light against other minority communities of India. A famous muslim Bangladeshi journalist even went as far to say that had Amir Khan done such acts in a muslim country, he would have been hanged without hesitation, praising the level of tolerence in India  The boycott was a reaction to Aamir Khan's remarks in 2015 about "growing intolerance" in India, his 2014 movie PK that offended Hindu nationalists and his 2017 meeting with Turkey’s president Recep Tayyip Erdoğan, who had criticized the deaths of Muslims in the Delhi riots.

Khan said that he was 'heartbroken' after seeing this trend, and requested people to watch his film. There were mixed opinions as to whether the film's poor performance was due to the boycott trend, unsatisfactory content, or an inappropriate time of release.

Box office 
Laal Singh Chaddha earned 11.70 crores at the domestic box office on its opening day. On the second day, the film collected 7.26 crore. On the third day, the film collected 9 crore. On the fourth day, the film collected 10 crore, taking a total domestic weekend collection to 37.96 crore.

It also became the highest-grossing Hindi film of 2022 at international box office, earning more than Gangubai Kathiawadi and The Kashmir Files.

References

External links 
 
 
 

2022 films
2022 comedy-drama films
2022 romantic comedy-drama films
2022 romantic drama films
2020s Hindi-language films
Indian comedy-drama films
Indian romantic drama films
Indian romantic comedy-drama films
Indian remakes of American films
Viacom18 Studios films
Films shot in Kollam
Hindi remakes of English films
Paramount Pictures films
Films shot in Andhra Pradesh
IMAX films
Films about autism
Alternate history films
Films about mother–son relationships
Films about intellectual disability
Films based on American novels
Film controversies in India